The Canton of Millas is a French former canton of the Pyrénées-Orientales department, in the Languedoc-Roussillon region. It had 23,008 inhabitants (2012). It was disbanded following the French canton reorganisation which came into effect in March 2015.

Composition
The canton comprised the following communes:

Millas 
Corbère
Corbère-les-Cabanes
Corneilla-la-Rivière
Néfiach
Pézilla-la-Rivière
Saint-Féliu-d'Amont
Saint-Féliu-d'Avall
Le Soler

References

Millas
2015 disestablishments in France
States and territories disestablished in 2015